The following is a list of episodes of the Ankama Animations cartoon television series Wakfu, which premiered on October 30, 2008. The show is based on a turn-based tactical MMORPG based on the series of the same name (although the show’s second season was airing by the time the game was finished) and airs on France 3. The story follows a boy named Yugo and his friends as they set out on a journey to discover Yugo’s origins, while meeting people and saving the world on their way.

Seasons 1 and 2 each have 26 episodes, while season 3 has 13 episodes. A fourth season is in development. Included in between seasons 2 and 3 are three original video animations (OVAs), along with three specials, bringing the total to 71 episodes.

The English cast for the first two seasons and the OVAs featured actors based in the UK; however, the dub of season 3 switches to an entirely new cast based in Los Angeles.

Context

Wakfu takes place in the fictional World of Twelve, a world inhabited by twelve distinct races; however, the show’s protagonist, Yugo is later revealed to be part of the 13th, the Eliatropes, who can make portals and have dragon partners. The series follows Yugo, a twelve-year-old boy and his friends, later known as the Brotherhood of the Tofu, who go on adventures while trying to discover who Yugo truly is. The first season follows the group’s journey to Oma Island, and later their attempts to stop the villain Nox. The second season focuses on the group’s journey to the Crimson Claw Archipelago, and Yugo’s attempts to defeat Qilby. The OVAs follow the group six years later, as Dally deals with the fact he is a god while attempting to stop a cataclysmic event known as Ogrest’s chaos. Season 3 follows Yugo as he tries to stop a changed Adamaï and a mysterious figure known as Oropo from destroying the world.

The major races of the World of Twelve Include:
-The Iops, brazen warriors who often charge into fights without thinking
-The Sadida, people with a strong connection to plants (Adidas backwards)
-The Cra, people skilled at archery (Arc backwards)
-The Enutrof, a people obsessed with money (Fortune backwards) 
-The Pandawa, a panda-like people who are famous for their milk
-The Xelor, a group focused on time (Rolex backwards)
-The Eliatropes, an ancient race who can create portals and has dragon companions (Portail backwards without the e’s; this is French for portal)

All of these races serve central purposes and have relevant characters throughout the series, though there are others, too. They all serve the central purposes of either being Yugo’s friends, central antagonists, or simply people Yugo’s group meets on their adventures.

Series overview

Episodes

Season 1: 2008–10
Season 1 follows Yugo, a boy who accidentally discovers he can create portals, allowing him to transport himself or other people or objects. He, along with his friends, Percedal (a brazen Iop) Eva (a Cra skilled at archery, and Amalia’s bodyguard) Amalia (a Sadida, and the princess of the kingdom) and Ruel (a money-hungry Enutrof) go on a journey to Oma Island in an attempt to discover Yugo’s origins. The second half of the season follows the group’s attempts to stop Nox, a Xelor who wants to send the world back in time to see his family again; however, this will erase all the world’s people from existence.

Specials
E = number in series
P = number in specials

The specials serve as backstory episodes and follow three different major characters: the first goes back thousands of years to tell the legend of Goultard, the second chronicles the backstory of the first season’s main antagonist, Nox, and the third tells the partial story of Ogrest's origin.

Season 2: 2011–12
R=number in series
A=number in season

Season two follows the Brotherhood as they meet another Eliatrope, Qilby, who tells them they must head to the Crimson Claw Archipelago on the other side of the world to find the rest of the Eliatropes. They also confront the king of the Shushus, and Adamaï stays behind with Qilby, discovering his motives in the process - he seeks to destroy the Eliatropes as revenge for trapping him in eternal prison years ago. However, this motive soon changes, and the season ends with a climactic battle between four different sides on the archipelago.

Original Video Animations
E = number in series
P = number in OVAs

The Original Video Animations serve as a bridge between seasons 2 and 3 and follow Yugo’s group several years after the end of season 2 as they try to stop Ogrest's Chaos, a cataclysmic event used as a plot device, while Adamaï is lured towards the darkness by new friends and Dally deals with the sudden revelation that he is a god.

Season 3: 2017
R=number in series
A=number in season

Taking place a few years after the end of season 2, this season sees Yugo and friends reunite to take on a new foe, Oropo, a clone of Yugo who wants to destroy the world. He has lured Adamaï and other powerful demigods to his side, and he forces Yugo to climb his tower to prove his point, although they don’t succeed in doing this before the final battle begins.

References

Wakfu

pl:Wakfu#Spis odcinków